Brendan Trexler Iribe (born August 12, 1979) is an American game programmer, entrepreneur and the original CEO and co-founder of Oculus VR, Inc. and Scaleform. He is the managing partner at BIG Ventures, an early-stage venture fund.

Early life and education
Iribe was born and grew up in Maryland. He graduated from Atholton High School in Howard County, Maryland and then attended the University of Maryland, College Park, majoring in Computer Science which is part of the University of Maryland College of Computer, Mathematical, and Natural Sciences in College Park for two semesters before dropping out to work as a freelance programmer.

Career 
He started his career as a game programmer and worked on the user interface of Civilization IV. He was cofounder/CEO of Scaleform, a user interface technology provider for PC games. After Scaleform was sold to Autodesk he worked as product team lead at Gaikai. In 2012, he got together with Palmer Luckey to start a Kickstarter campaign for the Oculus Rift VR Headset bringing in about $2.4 million. Iribe took the position of CEO at the newly founded Oculus VR. In December 2016, he stepped down from the role of CEO and decided to lead its newly created PC VR group. As of October 2018, Brendan announced in a Facebook post he would be departing Oculus and its parent company Facebook, with no mentioned future plans. In December 2018, he invested in Sketchfab, an online platform for 3D and VR content.

Philanthropy 
In 2014 Iribe announced a  $31 million dollar donation to his alma mater, University of Maryland, College Park.
$30 million was for the Brendan Iribe Center for Computer Science and Engineering, a new building which includes labs for virtual reality, augmented reality, robotics, and artificial intelligence. The remaining $1 million was donated to establish a scholarship fund. Iribe's mother, Elizabeth Iribe, also gave $3 million to set up two endowed chairs in the school’s computer science department - the Elizabeth Stevinson Iribe Chair and the Paul Chrisman Iribe Chair (named after her brother).

References

External links 
 

1979 births
American computer businesspeople
American computer programmers
Living people
People from Maryland
Atholton High School alumni
Facebook employees
Video game programmers
American technology company founders
American technology chief executives
Virtual reality pioneers
American racing drivers
British GT Championship drivers
International GT Open drivers
FIA World Endurance Championship drivers
24 Hours of Le Mans drivers
Asian Le Mans Series drivers
24H Series drivers
Le Mans Cup drivers
WeatherTech SportsCar Championship drivers